G. darwini may refer to:
 Gabaza darwini
 Galapagoleon darwini
 Gibbosaverruca darwini
 Gonatocerus darwini
 Gryllus darwini, Otte & Peck, 1997, a cricket species in the genus Gryllus
 Grypotherium darwini, a synonym for Mylodon darwini, an extinct giant ground sloth species

See also
 G. darwinii (disambiguation)
 Darwini (disambiguation)